Erasmus Hospital is a hospital in the Anderlecht municipality of Brussels, Belgium. It is a teaching hospital associated with the Université libre de Bruxelles (ULB), and was opened in 1977. It has 858 beds and 3000 staff, treating 26,000 inpatients and 260,000 outpatients each year.

The hospital is named after the Dutch humanist writer and theologian Erasmus of Rotterdam, who lived in the so-called Erasmus House in Anderlecht, near the Church of St. Peter and St. Guidon, in the 16th century.

All four children of King Philippe and Queen Mathilde of Belgium (Princess Elisabeth, Duchess of Brabant, Prince Gabriel, Prince Emmanuel and Princess Eléonore) were born at Erasmus Hospital.

Beginning in 2018, the modernisation and extension of the hospital, called "New Erasme", will start in the south-west of the campus, next to the Bordet Institute.

References

External links
 Official site

Hospitals in Belgium
Hospitals established in 1968
Hospital buildings completed in 1977
Université libre de Bruxelles
Anderlecht